Maria Magdalena or Maria-Magdalena may refer to:

People 
 Mary Magdalene, one of Jesus' most celebrated disciples
 Maria Magdalena of Oettingen-Baldern (1619–1688), second wife of the Margrave William of Baden-Baden
 Archduchess Maria Maddalena of Austria (1589–1631), daughter of Charles II, Archduke of Inner Austria, wife of Cosimo II de' Medici, Grand Duke of Tuscany
 Archduchess Maria Magdalena of Austria (1689–1743), daughter of Emperor Leopold I

Churches 
 Colegiata de Santa María Magdalena, a church in Asturias, Spain
 Santa María Magdalena, Seville, a Baroque church in Seville, Spain
 Santa María Magdalena, Zaragoza, a church in Zaragoza, Spain
 Maria Magdalena Church, a church on Södermalm in central Stockholm, Sweden

Film and television 
 María Magdalena (film), a 1954 Argentine film
 María Magdalena: Pecadora de Magdala, a 1946 Mexican film
 Mary Magdalene (2018 film), a 2018 American film
 María Magdalena (TV series), a 2019 American TV series

Music 
 "(I'll Never Be) Maria Magdalena", a 1985 pop song by Sandra
 "Maria Magdalena" (song), the Austrian entry in the Eurovision Song Contest 1993
 "Marija Magdalena", a Croatian entry in the Eurovision Song Contest 1999 performed by Doris Dragović
 "Maria Magdalena", a song by Senidah and Surreal from Za Tebe (2022)
 "Maria Magdalena" (ballad), a Scandinavian ballad
 Maria Magdalena, a 2011 EP by Visions of Atlantis

Other uses
 Maria Magdalena (Hebbel), an 1844 German play by Christian Friedrich Hebbel

People with the given names
 María Magdalena Campos Pons (born 1959), Cuban artist
 Maria Magdalena Dumitrache (born 1977), Romanian rower
 Maria Magdalena Keverich (1746–1787), mother of Ludwig van Beethoven

See also 
 Maria Maddalena (disambiguation)
 Maria Maddalena de' Pazzi (disambiguation)
 Marie-Madeleine (disambiguation)
 Mary Magdalene (disambiguation)